Andreapol is an air base in Tver Oblast, Russia located 3 km east of Andreapol. It was built as an interceptor aircraft base. It was home to the 28th Guards Fighter Aviation Regiment (28 Gv IAP), which flew MiG-23P aircraft in the early 1990s  and soon acquired MiG-29 aircraft.

In 1994 to Andreapol were transferred part of the personnel and aircraft 773rd Guards Fighter Regiment, who joined the 28th Guards Fighter Aviation Regiment. In 2003, during runway repairs at Kubinka the aerobatic teams Russian Knights and Swifts were relocated to Andreapol.

A MiG-29 crashed on May 12, 2005 near the air base.

The 28th Regiment disbanded probably in 2009.

As of 2019, the Air Base is reported as being closed, or at least "inactive".

References

Soviet Air Force bases
Soviet Air Defence Force bases
Russian Air Force bases